Partridge is a city in Reno County, Kansas, United States.  As of the 2020 census, the population of the city was 209.

History

Partridge was laid out in 1886. It was incorporated as a city in 1906. Its name commemorates the partridge.

In 1887, the Chicago, Kansas and Nebraska Railway built a main line from Herington through Partridge to Pratt.  In 1888, this line was extended to Liberal.  Later, it was extended to Tucumcari, New Mexico and El Paso, Texas.  It was foreclosed on in 1891 and taken over by Chicago, Rock Island and Pacific Railway, which shut down in 1980; it was reorganized as Saint Louis southwestern railroad " the Cotton Belt",  and merged again in 1997 with Union Pacific Railroad.  Most locals still refer to this railroad as the "Rock Island."

Geography
Partridge is located at  (37.967308, -98.091511).

Climate
The climate in this area is characterized by hot, humid summers and generally mild to cool winters.  According to the Köppen Climate Classification system, Partridge has a humid continental climate, abbreviated "Dfa" on climate maps.

Demographics

2010 census
As of the census of 2010, there were 248 people, 97 households, and 67 families residing in the city. The racial makeup of the city was 90.7% White, 3.2% Native American, 2.0% from other races, and 4.0% from two or more races. Hispanic or Latino of any race were 5.6% of the population.

There were 97 households, of which 32.0% had children under the age of 18 living with them, 55.7% were married couples living together, 11.3% had a female householder with no husband present, 2.1% had a male householder with no wife present, and 30.9% were non-families. 27.8% of all households were made up of individuals, and 12.4% had someone living alone who was 65 years of age or older. The average household size was 2.56 and the average family size was 3.12.

The median age in the city was 42.5 years. 27% of residents were under the age of 18; 5.7% were between the ages of 18 and 24; 22.2% were from 25 to 44; 26.2% were from 45 to 64; and 19% were 65 years of age or older. The gender makeup of the city was 48.8% male and 51.2% female.

2000 census
As of the census of 2000, there were 259 people, 98 households, and 72 families residing in the city. The racial makeup of the city was 86.10% White, 3.47% African American, 5.79% Native American, 1.54% from other races, and 3.09% from two or more races. Hispanic or Latino of any race were 2.70% of the population.

There were 98 households, out of which 26.5% had children under the age of 18 living with them, 64.3% were married couples living together, 3.1% had a female householder with no husband present, and 26.5% were non-families. 25.5% of all households were made up of individuals, and 9.2% had someone living alone who was 65 years of age or older. The average household size was 2.64 and the average family size was 3.08.

In the city, the population was spread out, with 27.8% under the age of 18, 5.8% from 18 to 24, 25.5% from 25 to 44, 25.1% from 45 to 64, and 15.8% who were 65 years of age or older. The median age was 37 years. For every 100 females, there were 86.3 males. For every 100 females age 18 and over, there were 90.8 males.

The median income for a household in the city was $28,125, and the median income for a family was $35,000. Males had a median income of $23,750 versus $16,719 for females. The per capita income for the city was $13,754. About 6.9% of families and 5.2% of the population were below the poverty line, including 7.2% of those under the age of eighteen and 6.8% of those 65 or over.

Education
The community is served by Haven USD 312 public school district.

School unification consolidated Partridge High School into Haven High School. The Partridge High School mascot was Quails. The Partridge Quails won the Kansas State High School boys class B basketball championship in 1954.

References

Further reading

External links
 Partridge - City website
 Partridge - Directory of Public Officials
 Partridge city map, KDOT

Cities in Reno County, Kansas
Cities in Kansas
1886 establishments in Kansas
Populated places established in 1886